As I'm Suffering from Kadhal is a 2017 Indian Tamil-language romantic comedy streaming television series created, directed and written by Balaji Mohan. Set in urban Chennai, it narrates the story of three uniquely different young couples and a young divorced father and his 8-year-old daughter, and their quirky take on the varied aspects of modern-day love. The principal characters of the series include Sunder Ramu, Yuvina Parthavi, Sananth, Sanchana Natarajan, Dhanya Balakrishna, Balaji Mohan, Nakshathra Nagesh and Abhishek Joseph George. The ten-episode series was released on 16 June 2017 by Hotstar, and opened to positive reception from audiences. The series was renewed for a second season.

Plot 
The show revolves around the lives of Bala Kumar, a divorcee who shares the custody of his daughter Smriti; Divya and Badri, a live-in couple, who completely oppose the fact of getting married; Meera and Santhosh, a married couple, who absolutely hate each other; Raghav and Tanvi, who are in the process of getting married.

The series starts with Meera crashing her car and ruining Tanvi-Raghav's Pre-pre-engagement party. Divya then tells Raghav to check on Meera, and it is later discovered that Meera cheated on Santhosh with Raghav as Santhosh too cheated on her at his Bachelor party with a girl called Nii-vaa-suin in Bangkok. Badri hears their conversation and struggles to hide the truth. He eventually tells it to Divya.

At Raghav and Tanvi's pre-engagement party, Meera learns that she is pregnant. She throws the pregnancy-kit in the dustbin that is later seen by Divya. Santhosh and his friend add alcohol to Divya & Badri's juice. A drunk Divya and Badri blurt out the truth in front of everybody and even confess to Divya's dad that they don't want to get married.

Tanvi breaks up with Raghav. Meera tells Santhosh that she is pregnant with his baby and they both reconcile. Divya's dad warns Badri to marry Divya. Bala Kumar gets extremely sad and upset because his ex-wife shifts with Smriti and her husband to Bangalore. This story ends with a lot of confusion and happiness.

Cast

Main cast 

 Sunder Ramu as Bala Kumar
 Yuvina Parthavi as Smrithi
 Sananth as Badri
 Sanchana Natarajan as Divya
 Dhanya Balakrishna as Meera
 Balaji Mohan as Santosh
 Nakshathra Nagesh as Tanvi
 Abhishek Joseph George as Raghav

Guest appearance 
 RJ Love Guru (Vivaswan Rajesh) voiced as an Interviewer
 Arjunan as Balaji Mohan friend
 Robo Shankar as associate director
 Andrea Jeremiah as psychiatrist
 RJ Vigneshkanth as a photographer
 Vaidhyanathan as Divya's father
 Radha Shekar as Divya's mother
 Vijay Varadharajan as producer
 Vignesh Vijayakumar as assistant director
 VJ Ramya as Sara, Divya's friend

Episodes

Production 

Balaji Mohan initially planned As I'm Suffering from Kadhal as a feature film, but ultimately decided it was better made as a series, saying, "as I explored the concept further with parallel storylines falling into place, it didn't make sense to fit it into a two-hour film". He added that the decision to explore into a series was mostly due to the advice of Dhanush and Soundarya Rajinikanth, before he began work on Maari 2. Balaji also stated that the series is a more mature and deeper version of Kadhalil Sodhappuvadhu Yeppadi (2012), his feature film debut.

Balaji opined that the moral compass of the characters in the series is different from feature films, stating, "The whole audience that watches a feature film won't watch this . The people watching this series are also people who watch films... but I'm not targeting this for the whole of Tamil Nadu or all age groups. This is for people who've seen all this happening around them, and they understand that this is what happens today." He also added about the direct digital release opining that the medium ensured a huge degree of freedom, and also due to non-availability of restrictions from censoring as compared to a feature film.

The digital distribution of the series' rights were sold to Hotstar, which was owned and operated by Star India. Balaji stated that he needed a platform to have a universal approach to get a wider reach to the audiences across the world, and the decision to choose Hotstar, due to its growth in short span of time as a largest video streaming platform in the country, with the most comprehensive content library. Balaji produced the film under his Open Window banner and Trendloud, an original content studio tied up with the platform as his creative team ensured the creative freedom needed to create the show as he had envisioned.

Soundtrack 
The team released a song teaser in Hotstar composed by Satish Raghunathan on 31 May 2017, followed by the music video and the single on 2 June 2017. The lyrics for the song was penned by Balaji Mohan and sung by Anand Aravindakshan, Balaji Mohan, Dhanya Balakrishna, Karthika Vaidyanathan, Satish Raghunathan and choreographed by Gayathri Raguram.

Release 
As I'm Suffering from Kadhal was the first ever Indian series for Hotstar Originals. All the ten episodes of the series were released simultaneously on Hotstar on 16 June 2017, as opposed to a serialised format, in order to encourage binge-watching. The series opened to positive reception from audience and followed by the response, the makers renewed for a second season during the time of release. Balaji Mohan said that he had finished writing of the second season and ensured that the series will progress soon.

Critical reception 
Sujatha Narayanan of Firstpost wrote "The story of As I'm Suffering From Kadhal is bold with a capital B – without harming value systems or taking sides or passing judgement." Sruthi Raman of The Times of India assigned a score 3.5 (out of 5) and wrote "The show loses steam towards the end, culminating in a played-out revelation. But the characters seem to stay with us till the end." Vikram Venkateshwaran of The Quint wrote "As I’m Suffering From Kadhal is a refreshing rom-com that anyone living in a metro city can relate to. It comes with subtitles, so even if you don't speak Tamil or Telugu, you might enjoy it." Anirudh, a critic from Behindwoods Review Board, stated that the series is "a different and bold attempt made in trying to showcase the different types of relationships."

References

External links 
 

2017 Tamil-language television series debuts
2017 Tamil-language television series endings
Tamil-language Disney+ Hotstar original programming
Tamil-language romantic comedy television series
Tamil-language web series